Bone is an unincorporated community in Bonneville County, Idaho, United States. As of 2006, the community had two permanent residents and one business, the Bone Store; its population increases during ranching season. The store closed in 2017, but opened in 2020 under new management and a new name.

History
Bone was founded by Orion Yost Bone, who opened the first Bone Store in the early 1900s. The original store burned down in 1945 and was rebuilt by Max Rockwood (long time Bone resident and rancher) and relocated approximately 150 yds to the north.  Bone was the last community in Idaho to receive telephone service, which it did not get until 1982.

References

Unincorporated communities in Bonneville County, Idaho
Unincorporated communities in Idaho